George Burditt may refer to:

 George Burditt (lawyer) (1922–2013), American lawyer and politician
 George Burditt (writer) (1923–2013), American screenwriter and producer

See also
 George Burdett (disambiguation)